Asiaephorus longicucullus is a moth of the family Pterophoridae. It is known from Nepal, Japan (Kyushu, Honshu) and Assam.

The wingspan is 16–19 mm. Adults are on wing from May to October in Japan, in May in Nepal and in September in Assam.

The larvae feed on Salvia japonica and Scutellaria indica.

External links
Taxonomic And Biological Studies Of Pterophoridae Of Japan (Lepidoptera)
Japanese Moths
Asiaephorus gen. nov., a review and description of a new species (Lepidoptera: Pterophoridae)

Platyptiliini
Moths of Japan
Moths described in 2000
Taxa named by Cees Gielis